Aminoquinolines are derivatives of quinoline, most notable for their roles as antimalarial drugs. Depending upon the location of the amino group, they can be divided into:

 4-Aminoquinoline
 8-Aminoquinoline